Plaza Mexico is a historic riverside square in Manila, Philippines, located at the west end of Magallanes Drive and Riverside Drive in Intramuros bordering the Pasig River in the north. It is surrounded by the Aduana Building on the south, the Bureau of Immigration Building on the east and the ruins of the Bastión de Maestranza and Puerta de Almacenes on the west. The Pasig River Ferry has a station also named Plaza Mexico located northeast of the square behind the Immigration building. The square was named Plaza Mexico in 1964 to commemorate the 4th centenary of the expedition of Miguel López de Legazpi and Andres de Urdaneta from New Spain (Mexico) and the historic Manila-Acapulco galleon trade relations between the two nations that lasted 250 years. 

Located on this square is the monument to the IV Centenary of the Mexico–Philippines Maritime Expedition donated by the Mexican Secretary of The Navy Shipyards during the celebrations of the Year of Mexican-Philippine Friendship in 1964. On the other side of the square is a statue of Adolfo López Mateos, the President of Mexico who visited the city in 1962.

History

Until 1904, the area of Plaza Mexico contained the walls of the Baluarte de Santo Domingo which enclosed the Aduana Building and the old Santo Domingo Church. In that year the American colonial government, seeing the need to develop and expand the Pasig River docks, decided to tear down its walls and open up this side of Intramuros. The Magallanes Monument, originally erected in 1848 in the center of the esplanade called Paseo de Magallanes to honor the Portuguese navigator who discovered the Philippines, was transferred to this site fronting the Aduana Building. The monument was completely destroyed during World War II.

From 1962 to 1964, a series of cultural exchanges between the Philippines and Mexico was held to celebrate the Year of Mexican-Philippine Friendship. This resulted in the creation of several landmarks in the city dedicated to Mexico and the Philippines' long historical and cultural ties to the Latin American country. They include Plaza Mexico and its monuments, the statue of the Mexican hero of liberation Miguel Hidalgo on Bonifacio Drive, and the renaming of Taft Avenue Extension in Pasay to Mexico Road.

Gallery

See also
 Mexico–Philippines relations

References

Mexico
Buildings and structures in Intramuros